Don Muraco (born September 10, 1949) is an American retired professional wrestler and podcaster. He is best known for his appearances with the World Wrestling Federation from 1981 to 1988, where he held the WWF Intercontinental Heavyweight Championship on two occasions and was crowned the inaugural winner of the King of the Ring tournament in 1985. He was inducted into the WWE Hall of Fame class of 2004 and the Professional Wrestling Hall of Fame in 2014.

Professional wrestling career

Early career (1970–1981)
Muraco was born at Sunset Beach, Oahu, Hawaii in 1949 and is of Native Hawaiian heritage. A Hawaii state amateur wrestling champion for Punahou School in 1967, Muraco chose professional wrestling over football. He spent the first year of his career learning the ropes in Vancouver, Portland, Florida and Los Angeles before getting his first big break, for Verne Gagne's American Wrestling Association (AWA). Wrestling as a face, he often tag teamed with Jimmy Snuka, against wrestlers such as Larry Hennig, Ivan Koloff and Dusty Rhodes. In 1973, tired of life in Minneapolis, he left the AWA for Roy Shire's San Francisco NWA territory.

In 1974, Muraco moved to Championship Wrestling from Florida (CWF). He was frequently compared to the NWA World Champion Jack Brisco, whom he physically resembled. In a match between the two on May 28, 1974, Muraco reversed Brisco's finishing move, the figure four leglock. Though Muraco lost the match by disqualification, this feat made him a star.

After brief stints in Texas and Georgia, Muraco returned to California in 1975 and won his first singles title, the NWA Americas Heavyweight Championship. He then won the San Francisco version of the NWA World Tag Team Championship with Masked Invader #1. In San Francisco, Muraco learned to work as a heel.

From 1977 through 1981, Muraco shuttled several more times between Florida, San Francisco and his native Hawaii. In Florida, he was involved in two high-profile angles. In 1979, a masked villain called "The Magnificent M" appeared in the territory. Though it came as little surprise when he was eventually unmasked as Muraco, his bald head shocked the audience. Then, in 1980, he feuded with Barry Windham, in which the bigger and more experienced Muraco piledrove the rookie on the concrete floor. Windham eventually got his revenge, in the process becoming a credible wrestler in the eyes of the fans.

World Wrestling Federation (1981–1984, 1985–1988)

Intercontinental Heavyweight Champion (1981–1984)
Muraco debuted in the World Wrestling Federation (WWF) in Allentown, Pennsylvania defeating Steve King on February 24, 1981. Managed by The Grand Wizard, he captured the WWF Intercontinental Heavyweight Championship on June 20, 1981, from Pedro Morales; he lost it to Morales on November 23 in a Texas Death match, capping a bloody feud. That year, Muraco wrestled then WWF Heavyweight Champion Bob Backlund several times, including a 60-minute draw on October 24. He split 1982 between Mid-Atlantic Championship Wrestling (where he partnered with Roddy Piper for a time), Georgia Championship Wrestling (where he also wrestled under a mask as Dr. X) and New Japan Pro-Wrestling (where he wrestled in the annual MSG League tournament), before returning to the WWF that fall.

Now managed by Captain Lou Albano, Muraco regained the Intercontinental title from Morales on January 22, 1983. That year, Muraco feuded with Albano's former protégé, Jimmy Snuka. The feud culminated on October 17, in a steel cage match at Madison Square Garden. Snuka lost the match, but afterward dragged Muraco back into the ring and hit his finisher, the Superfly Splash, from the top of the 15-foot cage. In the crowd at the Garden for this match was future WWE Hall of Famer Mick Foley, the Sandman, Tommy Dreamer, and Bubba Ray Dudley.

During his two Intercontinental title reigns, Muraco had bloody feuds with Bob Backlund, Tony Atlas and Rocky Johnson. He portrayed an arrogant villain who angrily demanded respect, while engaging in disrespectful behavior himself; in one match, he brought a submarine sandwich to the ring and ate it while dominating his outmatched opponent. Later, he would preface his matches by dedicating his impending finishing move, the piledriver, to either the heel commentator or whomever he was feuding with at the time. Audiences regularly mocked Muraco and his Hawaiian origins with derisive chants of "beach bum". On February 11, 1984, Muraco lost the Intercontinental title to Tito Santana. After a series of unsuccessful rematches, Muraco took a hiatus from WWF in August 1984. He went to NWA Polynesian for a short stint, and also wrestled in Japan.

Alliance with Mr. Fuji (1985–1987)
Muraco returned to the WWF in 1985, managed by Mr. Fuji. After not wrestling on the card of the first WrestleMania, Muraco headlined three consecutive Madison Square Garden cards against WWF World Heavyweight Champion Hulk Hogan, climaxing in a bloody steel cage match on June 21, which Hogan won. On July 8, Muraco won the first King of the Ring tournament when he pinned The Iron Sheik in the Final. Before defeating the Sheik, Muraco had defeated the Junkyard Dog, Les Thornton and Pedro Morales to reach the Final.

In addition to feuding with Ricky Steamboat for much of the remainder of the year which included hanging Steamboat from the top rope with Steamboat's own karate belt on an episode of WWF Championship Wrestling, Fuji and Muraco debuted Fuji Vice, a series of skits parodying Miami Vice, on Tuesday Night Titans (Fuji General, a parody of the ABC soap General Hospital, followed soon after). In 1986, Muraco allied with Adrian Adonis and Bob Orton Jr. in their feud with Roddy Piper. This led to Orton and Muraco becoming a regular tag team. In March 1987 they lost to the Can-Am Connection (Tom Zenk and Rick Martel) in the opening match of Wrestlemania III in front of a reported 93,173 fans at the Pontiac Silverdome. In July 1987, a falling out between Muraco and Orton led to a feud between them and a face turn for Muraco. Muraco won almost every match in the feud, on TV and at house shows, until Orton left the WWF that year.

"The Rock" (1987–1988)
In a TV taping aired in November 1987, Muraco solidified his face status by saving Superstar Billy Graham from a three-on-one beating by Butch Reed, One Man Gang and Slick, and taking Graham as his new manager. Muraco adopted Graham's tie-dye attire and changed his nickname from "Magnificent Muraco" to "The Rock" (although announcer Gorilla Monsoon continued to refer to Muraco by his previous nickname). Muraco replaced Graham on the team led by his former rival Hulk Hogan at the first Survivor Series, and had a good showing at the first Royal Rumble, where he eliminated three wrestlers (tied for second most with "Hacksaw" Jim Duggan) and was one of the final four competitors. He later reached the quarterfinals of the WWF World Heavyweight Championship tournament at WrestleMania IV. In his final months with the WWF, he feuded with Greg Valentine and lost to Dino Bravo at the inaugural SummerSlam. Muraco had his last match in the WWF against Barry Horowitz in October 1988 on a tour of Italy, but was then fired.

Various promotions (1988–1995)
After leaving the WWF, Muraco split his time between Stampede Wrestling (where he defeated Makhan Singh to win the North American Heavyweight title), the AWA (where he wrestled AWA World Heavyweight Champion Larry Zbyszko to a double disqualification), All Japan Pro Wrestling, and Herb Abrams' UWF (where he feuded with Cactus Jack). On May 23, 1993 he made an appearance at World Championship Wrestling where he teamed with Dick Murdoch and Jimmy Snuka against Wahoo McDaniel, Jim Brunzell and Blackjack Mulligan at Slamboree 1993: A Legends' Reunion.

Eastern Championship Wrestling (1992–1993)
Before the promotion was renamed Extreme Championship Wrestling, Muraco rekindled old feuds there with Jimmy Snuka and Tito Santana. He defeated Snuka on September 30, 1992, for the ECW Championship, dropping it to The Sandman on November 16. On April 3, 1993, he regained it in a rematch, finally losing it to Santana on August 8.

Wrestle Association R (1994)
Muraco, as Aka Oni, debuted for Wrestle Association R (WAR) on August 25, 1994, defeating Takashi Ishikawa. He had twelve more matches with the promotion, culminating in a tag loss (with Ai Oni) to Animal Hamaguchi and Ryuma Go on December 4, at WAR Mega Power in Sumo Hall.

Retirement (1995–present)
After retiring from the ring in 1995, Muraco returned to Hawaii. In 2003, he co-founded Hawai'i Championship Wrestling with local TV producer Linda Bade, which ran from 2003 to 2008. He was the storyline commissioner of Hawai'i Championship Wrestling until 2006. He also worked as a longshoreman. On May 22, 1998, he returned to wrestling for one night where he lost to The Honky Tonk Man at Northern Wrestling States Wrestler Alliance. He also returned to wrestling in Hawaii where he defeated the Kodiak Bear at Hawaiian Islands Wrestling Federation on January 9, 1999.

In 2004, Muraco was inducted into the WWE Hall of Fame class of 2004 by Mick Foley, who, like Tommy Dreamer, Bubba Ray Dudley and D-Von Dudley, credits the 1983 steel cage match between Muraco and Snuka at Madison Square Garden (which he attended) as his inspiration for becoming a wrestler. He managed his son, Joe, in WXW. On August 27, 2005, he teamed with Joe to defeat another father and son team, Bob and Brad Armstrong, at WrestleReunion 2. In 2007, Muraco inducted his former manager, Mr. Fuji, into the WWE Hall of Fame class of 2007.

Muraco currently resides in Hawaii with his wife Sharon. He has three children, one of whom would follow in his footsteps as a professional wrestler, that being his son, Joe.

Championships and accomplishments
50th State Big Time Wrestling
NWA Pacific International Championship (1 time)
All-California Championship Wrestling
ACCW Heavyweight Championship (1 time)
Championship Wrestling from Florida
NWA Florida Heavyweight Championship (1 time)
NWA Florida Television Championship (1 time)
NWA United States Tag Team Championship (Florida version) (1 time) - with Jos LeDuc
Eastern Championship Wrestling
ECW Heavyweight Championship (2 times)
Georgia Championship Wrestling
NWA Macon Tag Team Championship (1 time) - with Robert Fuller
NWA Hollywood Wrestling
NWA Americas Heavyweight Championship (1 time)
NWA New Zealand
NWA British Empire/Commonwealth Heavyweight Championship (1 time)
NWA San Francisco
NWA United States Heavyweight Championship (San Francisco version) (1 time)
NWA World Tag Team Championship (San Francisco version) (1 time) - with Invader #1
Pacific Coast Championship Wrestling
PCCW Heavyweight Championship (1 time)
Professional Wrestling Hall of Fame
Class of 2014
Pro Wrestling Illustrated
PWI ranked him #50 of the top 500 singles wrestlers of the "PWI Years" in 2003
Stampede Wrestling
Stampede North American Heavyweight Championship (1 time)
World Wrestling Federation/Entertainment
WWF Intercontinental Heavyweight Championship (2 times)
King of the Ring (1985)
WWE Hall of Fame (Class of 2004)
Wrestling Observer Newsletter
Best Heel (1981)
Most Impressive Wrestler (1981)

References

External links
 
 WWE Hall of Fame profile

1949 births
20th-century professional wrestlers
American male professional wrestlers
American people of Native Hawaiian descent
ECW Heavyweight Champions/ECW World Heavyweight Champions
Living people
Native Hawaiian professional wrestlers
NWA Americas Heavyweight Champions
NWA Florida Heavyweight Champions
NWA Florida Television Champions
NWA Georgia Heavyweight Champions
People from Oahu
Professional wrestlers from Hawaii
Professional Wrestling Hall of Fame and Museum
Punahou School alumni
Stampede Wrestling alumni
Stampede Wrestling North American Heavyweight Champions
The Dangerous Alliance members
WWE Hall of Fame inductees
WWF/WWE King Crown's Champions/King of the Ring winners